The 7th arrondissement of Paris (VIIe arrondissement) is one of the 20 arrondissements of the capital city of France. In spoken French, this arrondissement is referred to as le septième.

The arrondissement, called Palais-Bourbon in a reference to the seat of the National Assembly, includes some of the major and well-known tourist attractions of Paris, such as the Eiffel Tower, the Hôtel des Invalides (Napoleon's resting place), the Chapel of Our Lady of the Miraculous Medal, as well as a concentration of museums such as the Musée d'Orsay, Musée Rodin and the Musée du Quai Branly – Jacques Chirac.

Situated on the Rive Gauche—the "Left" bank of the River Seine—this central arrondissement, which includes the historical aristocratic neighbourhood of Faubourg Saint-Germain, contains a number of French national institutions, among them the National Assembly and numerous government ministries. It is also home to many foreign diplomatic embassies, some of them occupying outstanding hôtels particuliers.

The arrondissement has been home to the French upper class since the 17th century, when it became the new residence of France's highest nobility. The district has been so fashionable within the French aristocracy that the phrase le Faubourg—referring to the ancient name of the current 7th arrondissement—has been used to describe French nobility ever since. The 7th arrondissement of Paris and Neuilly-sur-Seine form the most affluent and prestigious residential area in France.

History

During the 17th century, French high nobility started to move from the central Marais, the then-aristocratic district of Paris where nobles used to build their urban mansions (see Hotel de Soubise), to the clearer, less populated and less polluted Faubourg Saint-Germain.

The district became so fashionable within the French aristocracy that the phrase le Faubourg has been used to describe French nobility ever since. The oldest and most prestigious families of the French nobility built outstanding residences in the area, such as the Hôtel Matignon, the Hôtel de Salm, and the Hôtel Biron.

After the Revolution many of these mansions, offering magnificent inner spaces, many reception rooms and exquisite decoration, were confiscated and turned into national institutions. The French expression "les ors de la Republique" (literally "the golds of the Republic"), refers to the luxurious environment of the national palaces (outstanding official residences and priceless works of art), comes from that time.

During the Restauration, the Faubourg recovered its past glory as the most exclusive high nobility district of Paris and was the political heart of the country, home to the Ultra Party. After the Fall of Charles X, the district lost most of its political influence but remained the centre of the French upper class' social life.

During the 19th century, the arrondissement hosted no fewer than five Universal Exhibitions (1855, 1867, 1878, 1889, 1900) that have immensely impacted its cityscape. The Eiffel Tower and the Orsay building were built for these Exhibitions (respectively in 1889 and 1900).

Geography
The arrondissement has a total land area of 4.088 km2 (1.578 sq mi, or 1,010 acres).

Demography
The 7th arrondissement attained its peak population in 1926 when it had 110,684 inhabitants. Because it is the location of so many French government bodies, this arrondissement has never been as densely populated as some of the others.  In 1999, the population was 56,985, while the arrondissement provided 76,212 jobs.

Historical population

Immigration

Cityscape

Places of interest

Important places include:
 Palais Bourbon, meeting place of the National Assembly
 Eiffel Tower
 Hôtel Matignon
 Hôtel de Boisgelin (Rue de Varenne, Paris), historic building, home to the Italian embassy in Paris.
 Champ de Mars
 Musée d'Orsay
 École Militaire
 Hôtel des Invalides
 Maison de Verre
 Musée du quai Branly
 Musée national de la Légion d'Honneur et des Ordres de Chevalerie
 Musée Maillol
 Musée de l'Ordre de la Libération
 Musée Rodin
 Musée Valentin Haüy
 Institut d'Etudes Politiques de Paris (Sciences Po)

Art and industry
 Musée du quai Branly
 Musée national de la Légion d'Honneur et des Ordres de Chevalerie
 Musée Maillol
 Musée de l'Ordre de la Libération
 Musée Rodin
 Musée Valentin Haüy
 National Horticultural Society of France

Economy
Air Liquide, Alcatel-Lucent, and Valode & Pistre have their head offices in this arrondissement.

Education

Public and private high schools:
Lycée Victor-Duruy
Établissement La Rochefoucauld
Institut de l'Alma
Lycée-collège Paul-Claudel
Lycée d'Hulst
Lycée Sainte-Jeanne Elisabeth
Lycée Saint-Thomas-d'Aquin
Lycée Thérèse-Chappuis

Istituto Statale Italiano Leonardo Da Vinci, an Italian international school, maintains two campuses in the arrondissement. The American University of Paris, a private liberal arts university, maintains several buildings near the Quai d'Orsay.

Government
The Ministry of Agriculture, the Ministry of Foreign Affairs and the Ministry of National Education have their head offices in the arrondissement.

Politically, the arrondissement is situated firmly on the right. The mayor of the 7th, Rachida Dati, was Minister of Justice under Nicolas Sarkozy's presidency and a member of the European Parliament for the centre-right UMP from 2009 to 2019. 

In the 2017 French presidential election, the 7th gave right-wing candidate François Fillon 52.7% of its votes in the first round, compared to his poor national showing of only 20%. It then went on to vote for Emmanuel Macron in the runoff by a landslide.

Sport
The arrondissement hosted the equestrian events for the 1900 Summer Olympics.

References

External links 

 

 
Venues of the 1900 Summer Olympics
Olympic equestrian venues
Histories of cities in France